Francesca Salvalajo (born 20 July 1972) is a retired backstroke swimmer from Italy. She represented her native country at the 1992 Summer Olympics in Barcelona, Spain. Salvalajo is a two-time gold medalist at the Mediterranean Games.

References

External links
 
 
 

1972 births
Living people
Italian female swimmers
Olympic swimmers of Italy
Swimmers at the 1992 Summer Olympics
Mediterranean Games medalists in swimming
Mediterranean Games gold medalists for Italy
Swimmers at the 1993 Mediterranean Games
Italian female backstroke swimmers
20th-century Italian women